Dan Harvey (born 16 June 1959) is an Irish military historian, author, and retired Lieutenant Colonel in the Irish Defence Forces.

Biography
Born and raised in Blackrock in County Cork, Harvey served in the Irish Defence Forces from 1978 to 2017, retiring with the rank of Lieutenant Colonel. He served in Ireland during the Troubles, mainly with the Southern Brigade, and saw active service overseas as a peacekeeper in Central Africa, Lebanon, Kosovo, the South Caucasus, and Vienna. As an author, Harvey has written extensively about the history of the Defence Forces, the Troubles, and the involvement of Irish men and women in significant battles such as Waterloo and D-Day. He now lives in Paris.

While serving in the Defence Forces, Harvey also worked as the museum curator for several award-winning military exhibitions in Ireland, including at Collins Barracks and the National Museum of Ireland. He is a longtime contributor to An Cosantóir, the magazine of the Irish Defence Forces. He was a military advisor on the 2006 Irish war drama film The Wind that Shakes the Barley.

Harvey is the nephew of former Taoiseach Jack Lynch.

Bibliography
The Barracks: A History of Victoria/Collins Barracks, Cork, Mercier Publishing 1997 (co-authored with Gerry White). 
Peacekeepers: Irish Soldiers in the Lebanon, Merlin Press 2001. 
Peace Enforcers, Book Republic 2010. 
"A” Company Action: The Battle of the Tunnel, Book Republic 2011. 
Attack on At Tiri: Force Met with Force, Maverick House 2014. 
Soldiers of the Short Grass: A History of the Curragh Camp, Irish Academic Press/Merrion Press 2016. 
A Bloody Day: The Irish at Waterloo, Irish Academic Press/Merrion Press 2017. 
A Bloody Night: The Irish at Rorke’s Drift, Irish Academic Press/Merrion Press 2017. 
Into Action: Irish Peacekeepers Under Fire 1960-2014, Merrion Press 2017. 
Soldiering Against Subversion, Merrion Press 2018. 
A Bloody Dawn: The Irish at D-Day, Merrion Press 2019. 
A Bloody Week: The Irish at Arnhem, Merrion Press 2019. 
A Bloody Victory: The Irish at War's End, Europe 1945, Merrion Press 2020. 
A Bloody Summer: The Irish at the Battle of Britain, Merrion Press, 2020. 
Missing in the Iron Triangle: The Search for Private Kevin Joyce South Lebanon (1981-2021), H-Books Cork Concepts Ltd, 2021.

References

Living people
1959 births
People from County Cork
Irish Army officers
Alumni of University College Cork
Alumni of Maynooth University
Alumni of the University of Galway
People educated at Christian Brothers College, Cork
Military historians